Unite Union (Unite) is a trade union in New Zealand. It represents a number of workers across various industries, and was the sponsor of the Supersizemypay.com campaign directed towards improving working conditions for fast food workers in the country, in addition to representing other hospitality and retail workers. Unite is affiliated with the New Zealand Council of Trade Unions.

History 
In mid 2003 a small group of trade unionists and activists attempted to "organise the unorganised". It began to focus on unionising workers predominantly from fast food, cinema and security.

In response to the Key Government's amendment to the Employment Relations Act 2000 allowing small businesses greater liberty to 'hire and fire' workers in the first 90 days, Unite established the 'Rat Patrol' to name and shame companies that abuse the legislation.

Matt McCarten's United Support Services, a company he formed to supply support services to the union, was placed into liquidation on 17 June 2011 owing $92,000 in unpaid taxes to the IRD.

In 2015 Unite engaged in the End Zero Hours campaign, primarily aimed at securing minimum guarantees of hours in union collective employment agreements. The campaign was ultimately successful with the National Government passing legislation outlawing "zero hour contracts".

It was the inspiration for the former Australian UNITE Union, which was founded in Melbourne in 2003.

References

External links
 Unite Union official site

New Zealand Council of Trade Unions
Trade unions in New Zealand
General unions